Cooke-Murphy Oval is a sports venue in Labrador, a suburb in the Gold Coast, Australia. It includes an Australian Rules Football ground.

It has been used by the NEAFL's Labrador Australian Football Club team as their home game base. The Gold Coast Suns reserves side also occasionally uses the ground for home matches.

See also

 Sports on the Gold Coast, Queensland

References

Australian rules football grounds
Cricket grounds in Queensland
Sports venues on the Gold Coast, Queensland
North East Australian Football League grounds